Cobia is a commune in Dâmbovița County, Muntenia, Romania. It is composed of ten villages: Blidari, Călugăreni, Căpșuna, Cobiuța, Crăciunești, Frasin-Deal, Frasin-Vale, Gherghițești (the commune center), Mănăstirea and Mislea.

Natives
 Ion Dincă

References

Communes in Dâmbovița County
Localities in Muntenia